Colombia's architectural heritage includes Spanish colonial architecture including Catholic churches. Its modern architecture represents various International Style architecture. In the postmodern architecture era a wave of innovate and striking buildings have been designed.

Colombian cultural heritage includes indigenous, European, Indian and African influences. The country's colonial buildings reflect their Spanish (and particularly Andalusian origin, as seen in the traditional single-story) houses laid around a central patio, to be found both in colonial towns such as Santafé (Bogotá), Tunja or Cartagena, or in rural haciendas throughout the country. After gaining its independence, Colombia severed its links with Spain and looked elsewhere for new models, first England, then France, marking the beginning of what became known as Republican Architecture (Arquitectura republicana), an era that lasted well into the twentieth century, when the changes in architectural thinking in Europe brought Modern Architecture to the country during the last years before World War II.

Prominent Colombian architects include Rafael Esguerra, Daniel Bermúdez, Giancarlo Mazzanti, Rogelio Salmona, Álvaro Barrera, Patricio Samper Gnecco, Bruce Graham, Laureano Forero Ochoa, Pedro Nel Gómez, Raúl Fajardo Moreno, Rafael Esguerra, Arturo Robledo Ocampo and Simón Vélez. Firms include plan:B.

Jorge Arango, Andres Cortes, Jaime Correa and Felipe Hernandez (architect) were born in Colombia. Bruce Graham worked in Colombia. Expats such as Leopold Rother worked in Colombia.

Pre-Columbian  period 

Pre-Columbian architecture was varied. The Muisca, although portrayed as the summit of Colombian indigenous civilization, was modest compared to Mesoamerica or the Inca Empire. Their architecture was limited to rather small settlements and structures, made out of wood and clay instead of stone. 

However some other pre-Columbian civilizations are known for their architecture, such as the Tairona (known for Ciudad Perdida) and the culture of Tierradentro.

Colonial period
Colombian architecture reflects seventeenth-century Spanish colonial origins. Regional differences derive from those found in Spain. Thus, hints of Moorish and Castilian architecture are evident in many cities. Many areas have had difficulty maintaining older structures, and the climate has destroyed many Baroque buildings. The many churches that dot the landscape are among the country's architectural gems, whose interiors reflect the influence of Medieval and Renaissance churches in Spain. Newer buildings in larger cities utilize modern styles with adaptations of the Baroque style supplemented with wood and wrought-iron elements.

Republican (Republicano) period

Modern architecture in Colombia
In the 1930s, Colombia began to embrace modern architecture. The new Liberal Party government tore down many older buildings that were replaced with buildings influenced by the International style. According to architectural historian Silvia Arango, Colombian modern architecture had two moments: a first one called the "Boast of technique", that, starting from the 40s, assimilated and replicated foreign influence through the use of modern techniques (as concrete structures and prefabricated pieces), and a second one, called the "Conscious assimilation", that used some the technical and stylistic elements from the modern movement and mixed it with local materials and formal languages that didn't coincide with the Modern canon.

Housing developments
Until the mid-1940s, most Colombians lived in single-family dwellings built of cinder blocks and covered with an adobe made of clay, cow manure, and hay. Uncontrolled urban growth due to massive migration from rural areas resulted in large unplanned settlements in cities. There have been a few notable examples of high-density housing projects, but most are targeted to the rising middle-class. These include the Centro Antonio Nariño, which followed the principles of Le Corbusier and the Torres del Parque by architect Rogelio Salmona.

Gallery

Cathedrals

Buildings
Some of the most important buildings in Colombia are:

Historic heritage

Bogotá

Medellín

Cartagena-Santa Marta

Cúcuta-Villa del Rosario

Landmarks

Guadua architecture

Architectural styles in Colombia

Colonial architecture in Colombia

Neoclassical architecture in Colombia

Romanesque Revival architecture

Gothic Revival architecture

Neo-Mudéjar architecture

Art Deco architecture

See also 

Muisca architecture

References